The 12492 / 12491 Jammu Tawi–Barauni Maur Dhawaj Express is a Express train belonging to Indian Railways – Northern Railway zone that runs between  and  in India.

It operates as train number 12492 from Jammu Tawi to Barauni Junction and as train number 12491 in the reverse direction, serving the 6 states of Jammu and Kashmir, Punjab, Haryana, Uttar Pradesh, Uttarakhand and Bihar.

Routeing

Traction

As the route is electrified, a Ghaziabad-based WAP-4 locomotive powers the train for its entire journey.

See also 

 Jammu Tawi railway station
 Kanpur Central–Jammu Tawi Superfast Express
 Muri Express

References 

 http://www.holidayiq.com/railways/maur-dhwaj-express-12492-train.html

External links

Transport in Muzaffarpur
Named passenger trains of India
Rail transport in Jammu and Kashmir
Rail transport in Punjab, India
Rail transport in Haryana
Rail transport in Uttar Pradesh
Rail transport in Uttarakhand
Rail transport in Bihar
Transport in Jammu
Express trains in India